Addison Township is a township in Cass County, North Dakota, United States.

Demographics

References

Townships in Cass County, North Dakota
Townships in North Dakota